Unity Line is a Polish company that operates RoRo and train ferry services between Świnoujście in Poland and the Swedish ports of Ystad and Trelleborg.

Routes
Unity Line operates two routes across the Baltic Sea.

Świnoujście - Ystad
Świnoujście - Trelleborg

Fleet
Unity Line currently (December 2018) operates a fleet of seven ships.

On 26 November 2021 in Gdansd Remontowa Shiprepair Yard and Polskie Promy signed a contract to built three new ferries with an option about a fourth one. Thwo of them will be built for Unity Line.

References

Companies based in Szczecin
Transport companies established in 1994
Ferry companies of Poland
Ferry companies of Sweden
Polish brands